Siphlonurus spectabilis is a species of primitive minnow mayfly in the family Siphlonuridae. It is found in northern Canada and the western United States.

References

Siphlonuridae
Articles created by Qbugbot
Insects described in 1934